Upper Hansen Lake is an alpine lake in Custer County, Idaho, United States, located in the Sawtooth Mountains in the Sawtooth National Recreation Area. Upper Hansen Lake is accessed via Sawtooth National Forest trail 640 from the Stanley Lake trailhead on forest service road 455 from State Highway 21.

Upper Hansen Lake is the smallest of the three Hansen Lakes.  Lower and Middle Hanson Lakes are a short distance downhill from Upper Hansen Lake.  The stream that drains the Hanson Lakes goes over Bridal Veil Falls before flowing into Stanley Lake Creek.

References

See also
 List of lakes of the Sawtooth Mountains (Idaho)
 Sawtooth National Forest
 Sawtooth National Recreation Area
 Sawtooth Range (Idaho)

Lakes of Idaho
Lakes of Custer County, Idaho
Glacial lakes of the United States
Glacial lakes of the Sawtooth National Forest